Ágætis byrjun (A good beginning) is the second studio album by Icelandic post-rock band Sigur Rós, released on 12 June 1999. The album was recorded between the summer of 1998 and the spring of 1999 with producer Ken Thomas. Ágætis byrjun represented a substantial departure from the band's previous album Von, with that album's extended ambient soundscapes replaced by Jónsi Birgisson's cello-bowed guitarwork and orchestration, using a double string octet amongst other chamber elements.

Ágætis byrjun became Sigur Rós's breakthrough album, both commercially and critically. It received a 2000 release in the United Kingdom and a 2001 release in the United States. According to their label Smekkleysa, the album sold 10,000 copies on its first year of release in Iceland, earning the band platinum status. It won numerous awards, and has appeared on multiple critics' lists of the best albums of the 2000s.

Ágætis byrjun is the band's first album to feature keyboardist Kjartan Sveinsson, and their last to feature drummer Ágúst Ævar Gunnarsson, who left the band several months after the album was released. Gunnarsson was replaced by Orri Páll Dýrason in the same year.

Composition

The ten songs on the album include some self-reference: the introduction contains backmasked parts from the title track, and the last song, "Avalon", consists of a different take of an instrumental passage from "Starálfur" slowed to around a quarter of its original speed. The strings in "Starálfur" are palindromic; they are the same forwards and backwards.

All vocals are sung in Icelandic, except for those on "Olsen Olsen" and the last section of the title track, which are sung in the gibberish language Vonlenska. Sigur Rós' subsequent album,, used Vonlenska exclusively for its vocals.

Packaging
The album's title came from a friend hearing the first song they had written for the album, which would become the title track. After hearing the song, he said it was "a good beginning"; the name stuck. The name has also been translated as "An alright start."

The sketch on the cover was drawn by Gotti Bernhöft with a Bic Cristal ballpoint pen. The booklet cover for the CD edition of the album features the line: "Ég gaf ykkur von sem varð að vonbrigðum... þetta er ágætis byrjun" which translates to "I gave you (plural) hope that became a disappointment... this is a good beginning". This line is a reference to their two previous releases, Von and Von brigði.

Sigur Rós assembled and glued together the cases of the first print of Ágætis byrjun themselves. As a result, many of the CDs were unusable due to glue stains.

Reception

While released to little fanfare, the album quickly gained radio exposure in Iceland, and spent the autumn of 1999 climbing the Icelandic album charts, finally resting at the top for a number of weeks. After surprising success in Iceland, the album subsequently gained strong international buzz with numerous articles in many prominent publications, hype from internet message boards and blogs, as well as often exuberant critical praise. Ágætis byrjun was released in the United Kingdom in 2000, and in the North American market in 2001 by Fat Cat Records. In 2001, Ágætis byrjun won the inaugural Shortlist Music Prize.

An acclaimed music video was made for "Viðrar vel til loftárása". The album's tracks have also been featured in soundtracks; "Starálfur" was used in The Life Aquatic with Steve Zissou and the Emmy winning 2005 TV film The Girl in the Café. "Svefn-g-englar" was used in Vanilla Sky, amongst others. The song "Flugufrelsarinn" has been arranged by Stephen Prustman for the Kronos Quartet, and is available on their download-only release Kronos Quartet Plays Sigur Rós.

Ágætis byrjun was placed by Pitchfork at number 2 on their annual Best Albums list for 2000, and was placed at 8 on their top 200 albums of the 2000s, released on 2 October 2009.

In December 2009, Rolling Stone ranked Ágætis byrjun the 29th best album of the 2000s.

In the Q and Mojo Classic Special Edition "Pink Floyd & The Story of Prog Rock", the album placed at number 27 in its list of "40 Cosmic Rock Albums".

The album was also included in the book 1001 Albums You Must Hear Before You Die.

It was announced in 2009 that a deluxe edition would be released to mark the 10th anniversary of Ágætis byrjuns international release. It was slated for release in early summer 2015. It was to feature previously unheard studio and live recordings as well as photographic and documentary material from the band's personal archives.

Ágætis byrjun peaked at No. 24 on Billboards Top Independent Albums chart in January and  it has sold 227,000 copies in the US, according to Nielsen SoundScan. In Europe it was upgraded to Platinum by Impala award for 400,000+ copies sold up to 2012.

Track listing

20th Anniversary Deluxe Edition 
On July 5, 2019, the band released an anniversary edition of the album as a 4-CD box set, and as a limited-edition, 7-vinyl-album set. It features early versions and demos of the songs on the record, and unreleased songs, pulled together from the band's personal archive, as well as The Icelandic Opera (Íslenska Óperan) June 12, 1999 concert, recorded for the Icelandic radio.

Personnel
 Jón Þór Birgisson – vocals, guitar
 Kjartan Sveinsson – keyboard
 Georg Hólm – bass guitar
 Ágúst Ævar Gunnarsson – drums (several tracks only)

Charts

Weekly charts

Year-end charts

Certifications and sales

Release history

References

External links
 Ágætis byrjun page on the Sigur Rós website
 
 

Sigur Rós albums
1999 albums
Albums produced by Ken Thomas (record producer)
FatCat Records albums